Lauren Rose Crace (born 25 May 1986) is an English actress and radio presenter, known for her portrayal of Danielle Jones in the BBC soap opera EastEnders from 2008 to 2009.

Early life
The daughter of contemporary writer Jim Crace and Pamela Turton, Lauren Rose Crace was born in Birmingham. She has an older brother, Thomas, born 1981. She attended Swanshurst School in Billesley, and then Cadbury Sixth Form College, where she took both a GCSE and an A-Level in Drama. She joined the Stage 2 Youth theatre aged eleven. and later went on to train at Royal Academy of Dramatic Art, she graduated in 2008.

Career
Crace began her acting career as an extra in television series. She also appeared in theatre productions, including leading roles in Alice in Wonderland and Sweeney Todd. In 2008, she joined the cast of the BBC soap opera EastEnders portraying the role of Danielle Jones. The viewing figures for Crace's last EastEnders episode peaked at 11.5 million; due to this, there was a surge in the national power grid. Crace won the award for Best Newcomer for her role in EastEnders at the TV Quick and TV Choice Awards.

In February 2010, Crace filmed a role in the BBC television series Sherlock, which broadcast later that year. From 29 April to 22 May 2010, Crace appeared at the Salisbury Playhouse as Cecile Volanges in Les Liaisons Dangereuses. From 2013 to 2015, Crace portrayed the recurring role of Doris Millar in ITV drama Mr Selfridge. In January 2018, Crace joined Free Radio as one of four presenters of its Birmingham breakfast show. Later that year, she appeared in two episodes of ITV drama Vanity Fair. She portrayed the role of Betsey Horrocks.

Filmography

Film

Audio

Stage

References

External links
 

1986 births
Living people
Alumni of RADA
Actresses from Birmingham, West Midlands
English soap opera actresses
English stage actresses
English television actresses